Multicultural Broadcasting is a media company based in New York City founded by Chinese-American businessman Arthur Liu.  It caters mostly to the Asian American community and owns television and radio stations in several of the top markets in multiple languages.

The company was founded as Multicultural Radio Broadcasting Inc. (MRBI) in 1982 with an initial business in United States radio broadcasting industry. To this day, it remains the largest Asian American owned media group in the U.S.

Air America controversy
In 2004, two weeks after Air America Radio's debut, it was pulled off the Multicultural radio stations in the Chicago and Santa Monica markets due to a contract dispute. Air America alleged that Multicultural sold time on their Los Angeles station to both AAR and another party, and claimed that was why they stopped payment on checks due Multicultural while AAR investigated.

Multicultural noted that Air America bounced a check and claimed they were owed in excess of $1 million. Air America Radio filed a complaint in New York Supreme Court, charging breach of contract and was briefly granted an injunction to restore the network on WNTD in Chicago. On April 20, the network announced the dispute had been settled, and Air America's last day of broadcast on WNTD was April 30. The New York Supreme Court ultimately concluded that the injunction was improvidently entered and that Air America Radio's court action was without merit, dismissing Air America's complaint and awarding over $250,000 in damages and attorneys' fees to Multicultural. According to a subsequent lawsuit filed by Multicultural, Air America Radio never paid the sums ordered by the court.

Radio stations by state
Source for list:

California
KALI-FM - Santa Ana
KALI (AM) - Orange
KAZN - Pasadena/Los Angeles
KAHZ - Pasadena (at Pomona)
KMRB - Los Angeles 
KBLA - Santa Monica/Los Angeles
KFSG - Sacramento
KLIB - Sacramento
KATD - Pittsburg/Sacramento (satellite of KIQI 1010)
KEST - San Francisco
KIQI - San Francisco
KSJX - San Jose/San Francisco

Florida
WNMA - Miami
WEXY - Fort Lauderdale/Miami
WJCC - Miami

Maryland
WLXE - Rockville
WFBR - Glen Burnie

Massachusetts
WAZN - Watertown
WLYN - Lynn

New Jersey
WHWH - Princeton
WPAT - Paterson (NYC)
WWRU - Jersey City (NYC)

New York
WKDM - New York City
WZRC - New York City

Pennsylvania
WTTM - Philadelphia

Texas
KDFT - Dallas/Fort Worth Metroplex (at Ferris)
KMNY - Dallas/Fort Worth Metroplex (at Hurst)
KCHN - Houston

Washington
KXPA - Seattle
KARI - Blaine
KVRI - Blaine (studios in Surrey, British Columbia, serving Metro Vancouver)

Television
On September 26, 2006, Multicultural Broadcasting made an agreement with The E. W. Scripps Company to buy five of Scripps' Shop At Home/Jewelry Television affiliated broadcast television stations for $170 million. Sales were final on KCNS (San Francisco), WOAC (Canton, Ohio; now WRLM), WRAY-TV (Raleigh/Durham, North Carolina) on December 20, 2006, followed by WMFP (Boston) and WSAH (Bridgeport, Connecticut). Prior to that, the five stations switched to a 24-hour infomercial format. The Sunbelt Television-owned KHIZ (now KILM) (Barstow, California) has been absorbed into Multicultural's portfolio upon FCC approval, however, it remained an affiliate of SonLife Broadcasting Network.

On November 5, 2008; Multicultural Broadcasting has suffered financial defaults of $135 million in loans and the company has headed into a trust under the care and feeding of Lee W. Shubert for the purposes of selling off assets and paying off their creditors. Stations included KCNS, WMFP, WOAC, and WRAY-TV. WOAC  was the first to be picked up on June 24, 2009 by Tri-State Christian Television, through Radiant Life Ministries. WRAY-TV was sold in October 2009. In January 2011, KCNS, WMFP, and WSAH were sold to NRJ TV, LLC. KILM was the only remaining TV station in the Multicultural group until 2018 when Ion Media purchased it and converted it to an Ion Life affiliate.

In 2012 Arthur Liu sold its headquarters at 449 Broadway, relocating executive offices and studios to 40 Exchange Place in the Financial district.

References

External links
 

 
Television networks in the United States
Radio broadcasting companies of the United States
Companies based in New York City